Winter Ave Zoli (born June 28, 1980) is an American actress and model. She is best known for her role as Lyla Winston in FX's TV series Sons of Anarchy, Amy Snyder in Bosch (2017-2018), and for Deserted (2016). Zoli also appears in Code Black (2015) and Agents of S.H.I.E.L.D (2015).

Early life
Zoli was born in New Hope, Pennsylvania to Richard and Sue Uhlarik. She is of partial Czechoslovakian descent. At the age of 11, she moved with her family to Czech Republic. She attended middle school and high school at the International School of Prague. She studied ballet, but after developing a love for the stage and the craft of acting, she moved on to musical theater.

At age 13, she began working in European and American productions that came to Prague. At 17, she attended the Carnegie-Mellon summer school theater program and, at 19, enrolled in the Atlantic Theater Company acting school in New York City, founded by playwright David Mamet and actor William H. Macy.

Career
After graduating from the professional program, Winter moved to Los Angeles. She appeared in the 2007 film Sex and Death 101 as Alexis, the fast food beauty. She held the main role of legendary Libuše in the 2009 Czech film The Pagan Queen. Winter gained further international recognition with her main role as Lyla Winston on the hit American TV series Sons of Anarchy. She posed nude in Playboy magazine's March 2011 edition, commenting that "nudity is not a problem for [her]."

In 2016, Winter starred in the feature film Deserted opposite Mischa Barton, Jackson Davis, Trent Ford, Dana Rosendorff, Lance Henriksen, Jake Busey and Gerry Bednob. The film is a psychological thriller about a group of friends on a road trip to a music festival in "Death Valley - which results in getting them hopelessly lost in the most stunning, but unforgiving, topographical terrain on the planet".

Filmography

Film

Television

References

External links

Winter Ave Zoli at Playboy Blog

American film actresses
1986 births
Living people
American people of Czech descent
American television actresses
Actresses from Pennsylvania
21st-century American women